Eva Stachniak (born 1952) is a Polish-Canadian novelist.

Biography
Stachniak came to Canada in 1981 to study at McGill University, and remained in the country after the imposition of martial law in Poland prevented her from returning home. She worked for Radio Canada International from 1984 to 1986, and then moved to Toronto to teach at Sheridan College.

Her debut novel Necessary Lies, published in 2000, won the Books in Canada First Novel Award. Her second novel, Garden of Venus, followed in 2005. The book was also published under the title Dancing with Kings in the United Kingdom.

Her third novel, The Winter Palace, was published in 2012. A historical novel about Catherine the Great, The Winter Palace became Stachniak's first Canadian and international bestseller. She followed with a sequel novel, Empress of the Night, in 2014.

She has also published short stories in literary magazines and anthologies.

Works
Necessary Lies (2000)
Garden of Venus (2005)
The Winter Palace (2012)
Empress of the Night (2014)
The Chosen Maiden (2017)
The School of Mirrors (2022)

References

External links
 Eva Stachniak

1952 births
Living people
21st-century Canadian novelists
Canadian women novelists
Canadian historical novelists
Canadian women short story writers
Polish emigrants to Canada
Polish women novelists
Polish women short story writers
Polish short story writers
Writers from Toronto
Polish historical novelists
Writers from Wrocław
McGill University alumni
21st-century Canadian short story writers
21st-century Canadian women writers
Women historical novelists
21st-century Polish novelists
Amazon.ca First Novel Award winners